Dachengzi Town is a town located in the Miyun District of Beijing, China. It sits within a valley, with Hongmenchuan and Qingshui Rivers flow through it. The town borders Taishitun and Beizhuang Towns in its north, Shangshidong Township and Liudaohe Town in its east, Zhenluoying and Dahushan Towns in its south, and Jugezhuang Town in its west. Its population was 9,443 in 2020.

The name Dachengzi comes from Dachengzi Village, the place where the town's government resides in.

History

Administrative divisions 
By the end of 2021, Dachengzi Town administered 23 subdivisions: 1 community and 22 villages. They are listed as follows:

Transportation 
Beijing-Chengde Expressway, Mixing Road and Beijing–Shenyang high-speed railway are the main roads within the town.

See also 
 List of township-level divisions of Beijing

References

Miyun District
Towns in Beijing